The Emmanuel Episcopal Church in San Angelo, Texas is a historic church located at 3 S. Randolph.  The church was founded in 1885–87. Its building was built in 1929 and added to the National Register of Historic Places in 1988.

It is an ashlar stone faced church with a Gothic arch entry.  The stone was recycled from the former Tom Green County courthouse, demolished in 1927.

An education wing was added in 1950 and was later extended, with compatible materials and styling.

See also

National Register of Historic Places listings in Texas

References

Episcopal churches in Texas
Churches on the National Register of Historic Places in Texas
Churches completed in 1929
20th-century Episcopal church buildings
Churches in Tom Green County, Texas
Buildings and structures in San Angelo, Texas
National Register of Historic Places in Tom Green County, Texas
Recorded Texas Historic Landmarks